The Iowa State Cyclones women's basketball team represents Iowa State University (ISU) and competes in the Big 12 Conference of NCAA Division I. The team is coached by Bill Fennelly, who is in his 28th year at Iowa State.  The Cyclones play their home games at Hilton Coliseum on Iowa State's campus.

Overview
Iowa State University is known for having one of the best women's basketball programs in the nation.  Since the founding of the Big 12 in 1996, ISU has had only three losing seasons, has won three conference titles (1 regular season, 3 tournament), and has the best conference tournament record in the Big 12.  Iowa State has made it to and won the Big 12 tournament championship game more times than any team except Oklahoma. Bill Fennelly is the coach of the women's team and largely responsible for building the program.  In games played since the Big 12 was founded in 1996, ISU has a winning record against every Big 12 school except Baylor.

On a national level, since 1996 the Cyclones have made the NCAA tournament twenty one times,  advancing six times to the Sweet Sixteen, including twice to the Elite Eight.  Additionally, Iowa State has made the WNIT twice in that span.  ISU was in the AP Top 25 poll for over four years and was in the Top 10 for 34 consecutive weeks starting in the 1999 season.  ISU has been ranked in the top 10 for attendance every season since 1999–2000, including a #3 ranking for the 2008–2009 season which led all Big 12 schools and #2 nationally for the 2012–2013 season.

History

Gloria Crosby (1973–1974) 

In 1973, Coach Gloria Crosby led the Iowa State Women's Basketball team through their first season as a Division I program.  Prior to that, women were only able to play intramural basketball.  The team, at that point known as the "Cagers", played their first game on January 12, 1974, losing to Northern Iowa by 73–38.  Crosby and the Iowa State Women's Basketball team got their first win a week later over Wartburg, 51–38.  Gloria Crosby coached just one season and finished her basketball coach career at ISU with an 8–8 record.  She would become the head coach of the Iowa State Softball team.

Lynn Wheeler (1974–1980)

Lynn Wheeler took over as head coach for ISU's second season of women's basketball (1974). Wheeler coached for six seasons and had winning records in three of those seasons.  In Wheeler's second season, she led Iowa State to its first 20 win season.  Lynn Wheeler resigned after finishing with 14 straight defeats, stating "I've taken this team as far as I can."

Deb Oing (1980–1984)

In 1981, Deb Oing became Iowa State’s third coach.  Over four seasons she coached ISU to a 31–80 record and was coach in 1984 for ISU's only winless conference season (0–14).  She coached Iowa State to the program’s first official Big Eight conference win, an 80–76 decision over Oklahoma in Ames on November 27, 1982.  In 1982, Oing served with Team USA as an assistant.

Pam Wettig (1984–1992)

Pam Wettig became Iowa State's fourth head coach in 1985.  Wettig coached for eight years and finished a 100–121 record.  Wettig coached Iowa State to their first win in the Big Eight Conference tournament in 1990 (the Big Eight switched to a single-elimination event in 1983).  Wettig was named Big Eight Coach of the Year for the 1985–1986 season.

Theresa Becker (1992–1995)

Theresa Becker became Iowa State’s fifth coach (1993–1995), finishing a disappointing 18–63 over three seasons.  Iowa State never finished better than a tie for 7th place in the Big Eight under Becker.

Bill Fennelly (1995–Present)

In 1995 (one year before inception of the Big 12), Iowa State hired former University of Toledo head women's basketball coach, Bill Fennelly.  When Fennelly arrived, Iowa State hadn't had a winning season in seven years and only five winning seasons ever.  In his first season, Fennelly led the Cyclones to a 17–10 record.  That is nearly as many wins as Fennelly's predecessor, Theresa Becker, had in her career (18) at ISU in the three previous years.

Fennelly came to Iowa State after building a successful program at Toledo (.758 overall winning percentage, three NCAA and three WNIT appearances).  In nineteen seasons at Iowa State (1995–2014), Fennelly has continued that success, compiling a record of 410–184 overall and 177–118 in conference play.

Under Fennelly, Iowa State advanced to its first NCAA appearance (1997), won its first NCAA game (1998), and hosted five consecutive NCAA first and second-round games (1998–2002) when host sites were earned, not pre-determined.  Fennelly was national runner-up for the Associated Press (AP) Coach of the Year and guided the Cyclones to their first national ranking, reaching #22 (both in 1998).  Iowa State advanced to the Elite 8 in 1999 and again in 2009.  The Cyclones have made it to the Sweet 16 six times (1999–2001, 2009, 2010, 2022).  Stacy Frese became Iowa State’s first AP All-American (1999).  Iowa State won the Big 12 regular season title (2000) and three Big 12 Conference tournament championships (2000–2001, 2023).  Iowa State defeated its first #1 ranked team (Texas Tech, ESPN poll) and advanced to its first post-season Final Four in the WNIT (both 2004).

Championships

Conference Tournament seeds
In their history of appearances in the Big Eight/Twelve Conference tournaments, they have been seeded in the top five spots 16 times, with the most common seed being 8th, which they have been placed eight times.

Big Eight Conference

Big 12 Conference

NCAA Tournament history

The Cyclones have a 21–20 record in the NCAA Tournament.

Head coaching records

Hilton Magic
The Cyclones play at Hilton Coliseum, on the campus of Iowa State University, in Ames, Iowa. The Cyclones’ yearly attendance average has grown from 733 fans per game the season before Coach Fennelly came to ISU to over 10,000 per contest in 2011–2012. ISU’s attendance has ranked among the top 11 schools nationally in each of the last 17 seasons, including ranking fourth for three straight years from 1999 to 2002 and fourth or higher for seven straight years from 2007 to 2014. Iowa State was ranked 2nd in attendance in 2013 and 2014. The Cyclones enjoyed their first-ever sellout crowd in a 2004 WNIT/NIT doubleheader against Saint Joseph's. In 2009, Iowa State had a higher total attendance with over 156,000 than 16 of the 31 Division I conferences.

Retired jerseys

Retired Jerseys

See also
 Iowa State Cyclones men's basketball

References

External links